SPATS2-like protein (spermatogenesis associated, serine-rich 2-like protein) or DNAPTP6 (DNA polymerase transactivated protein 6) is a protein that in humans is encoded by the SPATS2L gene.

References

Further reading